Edward Augustine Luther (born January 2, 1957 in Gardena, California) is a former American football quarterback in the National Football League. He was drafted by the San Diego Chargers in the fourth round of the 1980 NFL Draft. He played college football at San Jose State.

Luther was a backup quarterback behind Dan Fouts with the Chargers. He also played for the Indianapolis Colts and the Jacksonville Bulls in 1985 of the USFL.

References

External links
 

1957 births
Living people
American football quarterbacks
Indianapolis Colts players
People from Gardena, California
San Diego Chargers players
San Jose State Spartans football players
Sportspeople from Los Angeles County, California